Åros is a village in Kristiansand municipality in Agder county, Norway.  The village is located along the river Søgneelva between the village of Høllen to the west and Langenes to the east.  The west side of Åros reaches the Høllefjorden.  Åros Feriesenter is a large recreational area along the fjord.  It includes a camping facility and a beach area that is a popular attraction in the summer for residents and tourists alike.  Årosskogen is the main residential neighborhood in the village.

As a part of the greater Søgne urban area in Kristiansand, separate population statistics are not tracked for Åros.

References

External links
Åros Feriesenter

Villages in Agder
Geography of Kristiansand
Beaches of Kristiansand